The Victoria Cross (VC) is a military decoration awarded for valour "in the face of the enemy" to members of armed forces of some Commonwealth countries and previous British Empire territories. The VC was introduced, in Great Britain, on 29 January 1856 by Queen Victoria to reward acts of valour during the Crimean War. It takes precedence over all other orders, decorations and medals. It may be awarded to a person of any rank in any service, and to civilians under military command. All those who earn the VC have their names published in The London Gazette.

See also
 List of Victoria Cross recipients from the British 2nd Division

Notes

References

External links
 
 

British recipients of the Victoria Cross
Lists of recipients of the Victoria Cross by conflict
Crimean War recipients of the Victoria Cross
Second Boer War recipients of the Victoria Cross
World War I recipients of the Victoria Cross
World War II recipients of the Victoria Cross